Warty pig may refer to:

Sus bucculentus or Heude's pig, native to Laos and Vietnam
Sus cebifrons cebifrons, native to Cebu, Philippines, now extinct
Sus cebifrons, native to the Visayan Islands, Philippines
Sus celebensis, native to Sulawesi, Indonesia
Sus celebensis timoriensis, found in the Lesser Sunda Islands 
Sus heureni or Flores warty pig, native to southern Asia
Sus oliveri, native to Mindoro, Philippines
Sus philippensis, native to the Philippines
Sus verrucosus, native to Indonesia

See also
Warthog (disambiguation)

Suidae
Animal common name disambiguation pages